The Ffestiniog transmitting station is a broadcasting and telecommunications facility located on the slopes of Mynydd Maentwrog about  south of the town of Llan Ffestiniog, in Gwynedd, Wales. It was originally built by the IBA, entering service in early 1969 acting as a BBC and ITV relay transmitter for the now-defunct 405-line VHF television system.

Specifications
The television broadcasts primarily cover the towns of Ffestiniog, Blaenau Ffestiniog and the Vale of Ffestiniog in general.

625-line colour TV came to the site in the late 1970s.

The 405-line VHF television service closed across the UK in 1985, but according to the BBC's and ITV's transmitter list and the BBC's internal "Eng. Inf." magazine, Ffestiniog's 405 line services were due to close early - in the third quarter of 1982.

Ffestiniog currently broadcasts digital television and analogue FM radio.

Services listed by frequency

Analogue television

28 February 1969 - Late 1970s
The start date is for ITV service from the site. It is not clear when the BBC service commenced.

Late 1970s - Third Quarter 1982

Third Quarter 1982 - 21 October 2009
Channel 4 launched across the UK on 1 November 1982. Being in Wales, Ffestiniog broadcast the S4C variant. 405-line television was discontinued (after a mere 13 years) at about the same time as this new service started up. For the next 27 years there were to be no changes to the television output at this site.

Analogue and Digital Television

21 October 2009 - 18 November 2009
Digital switchover started at Llanddona and therefore at Ffestiniog and all its other relays. BBC 2 was closed down on channel 28 and ITV 1 was moved from channel 25 to channel 28 for its final three weeks of service. Mux A started up on the newly vacated channel 25 at full post-DSO power.

Digital Television

18 November 2009- present
All the remaining analogue TV transmitters were shut down and the three multiplexes of Freeview Lite took over their frequencies, leaving channel 32 unused for now.

Analogue radio (FM VHF)

14 December 1992 - January 2012
For its FM radio services, Ffestiniog acts as an off-air relay of Blaenplwyf.

See also
List of masts
List of radio stations in the United Kingdom
List of tallest buildings and structures in Great Britain

References

External links
 MB21's page on BBC 405 TV to Wales and the West
 405 Alive's list of transmitters"
 More details on 405-line BBC transmitters
 The Transmission Gallery: Photographs and Information 

Buildings and structures in Gwynedd
Transmitter sites in Wales
Maentwrog